William John Branch (20 February 1911 – 25 February 1985) was an English professional golfer. He finished 9th in the 1935 Open Championship and won the Belgian Open 10 days later. His last major success was in the 1954 Gleneagles-Saxone Foursomes Tournament.

Golf career
Branch's father, Jack was a golf professional. Jack had been at Woolacombe Bay Golf Club in Devon and Stafford Castle but was professional at Alsager Golf Club in 1911 when Branch was born. Jack moved to Henbury Golf Club near Bristol soon after Branch's birth and was professional there for 37 years until his death in 1949 aged 64. After leaving school Branch became an assistant to his father where he stayed until becoming an assistant at Leicestershire Golf  Club in 1937. He left the Leicestershire club at the end of 1945 and was unattached for some time until joining Berkhamstead Golf Club in 1949 and then moving to Ganton Golf Club in 1951. He was professional at Scarborough South Cliff Golf Club in the 1960s eventually moving to Fulford Golf Club in 1971.

Branch won the 1954 Gleneagles-Saxone Foursomes Tournament, in partnership with Donald Cameron. He was runner-up in the 1950 Daily Telegraph Foursomes Tournament and joint runner-up in the 1953 Silver King Tournament.

Tournament wins
1930 PGA Assistants' Championship
1932 West of England Professional Championship
1935 Belgian Open
1936 Dunlop-Midland Professional Championship
1954 Gleneagles-Saxone Foursomes Tournament (with Donald Cameron)

Results in major championships

Note: Branch only played in The Open Championship.

NT = No tournament
CUT = missed the half-way cut
"T" indicates a tie for a place

Team appearances
England–Scotland Professional Match (representing England): 1936 (winners)
Slazenger Trophy (representing Great Britain and Ireland): 1956 (winners)

References

English male golfers
People from Alsager
1911 births
1985 deaths